A vessel traffic service is a marine traffic monitoring system established by harbour or port authorities, similar to air traffic control for aircraft. The International Maritime Organization defines vessel traffic service as "a service implemented by a competent authority designed to improve the safety and efficiency of vessel traffic and protect the environment. The service shall have the capability to interact with the traffic and respond to traffic situations developing in the vessel traffic service area". Typical vessel traffic service systems use radar, closed-circuit television, VHF radiotelephony and automatic identification system to keep track of vessel movements and provide navigational safety in a limited geographical area.

In the United States, vessel traffic services are established and operated by the Coast Guard Navigation Center. Some services operate as partnerships between the Coast Guard and private agencies.

Personnel 
Guidelines require that the vessel traffic service authority should be provided with sufficient staff, appropriately qualified, suitably trained and capable of performing the tasks required, taking into consideration the type and level of services to be provided in conformity with the current International Maritime Organization guidelines on the subject.

International Association of Marine Aids to Navigation and Lighthouse Authorities Recommendation V-103 is the recommendation sn Standards for training and certification of vessel traffic service personnel. There are four associated model courses, V103/1 to V-103/4, which are approved by the International Maritime Organization and should be used when training personnel for the vessel traffic service qualifications.

Information service 
An information service is a service to ensure that essential information becomes available in time for onboard navigational decision-making.

The information service is provided by broadcasting information at fixed times and intervals or when deemed necessary by the vessel traffic service or at the request of a vessel, and may include for example reports on the position, identity and intentions of other traffic; waterway conditions; weather; hazards; or any other factors that may influence the vessel's transit.

Traffic organization service 
A traffic organization service is a service to prevent the development of dangerous maritime traffic situations and to provide for the safe and efficient movement of vessel traffic within the vessel traffic service area.

The traffic organization service concerns the operational management of traffic and the forward planning of vessel movements to prevent congestion and dangerous situations and is particularly relevant in times of high traffic density or when the movement of special transports may affect the flow of other traffic. The service may also include establishing and operating a system of traffic clearances or sailing plans, or both, in relation to priority of movements, allocation of space, mandatory reporting of movements in the service area, routes to be followed, speed limits to be observed or other appropriate measures which are considered necessary by the vessel traffic service authority.

Navigational assistance service 

Navigational assistance service is a service to assist onboard navigational decision-making and to monitor its effects.

The navigational assistance service is especially important in difficult navigational or meteorological circumstances or in case of defects or deficiencies. This service is normally rendered at the request of a vessel or by the vessel traffic service when deemed necessary.

See also
 Automatic identification system
 Automatic Packet Reporting System
 Ship movement service
 Sea traffic management

Gallery

References

External links 
 Vessel traffic management information system developed by the Canadian company XST Xpert Solutions Technologiques 
 Further vessel traffic service and management information system information
 What are Vessel Traffic Services? Article in the popular maritime information website marineinsight.com

 
Navigational equipment
Maritime communication
Technology systems
Navigational aids